Wang Xuan (February 5, 1937 – February 13, 2006), born in Wuxi, Jiangsu, was a Chinese computer scientist. He was a computer application specialist and innovator of the Chinese printing industry, as well as an academician at both the Chinese Academy of Sciences and the Chinese Academy of Engineering. He was the vice-president of the CPPCC and founder of the major technology conglomerate company Founder Group in 1986.

Biography

Not only did he contribute a lot, but he really loved his country.
Wang Xuan graduated from the Department of Mathematics and Mechanics at Peking University in 1958 and devoted himself to computer science education and research. He was mainly involved in research into computer processing of words, graphics and images. In 1975, he was in charge of the research and development of laser typesetting systems in the Chinese language and of electronic publishing systems. Surpassing Japan's second-generation optical designation and the third-generation CRT designation, the fourth-generation laser typesetting system he invented has not yet come onto the market in other countries. Thus he is dubbed "the Father of Chinese Language Laser Typesetting".

Awards and honors
Wang Xuan was awarded the State Preeminent Science and Technology Award in 2001 by President Jiang Zemin. Started in 2000, this highest degree prize of science and technology in China, has only been awarded to 9 scientists by 2006. Asteroid 4913 Wangxuan, discovered at the Purple Mountain Observatory in 1965, was named in his memory. The official  was published by the Minor Planet Center on 24 November 2007.

References

External links

1937 births
2006 deaths
Businesspeople from Wuxi
Chinese company founders
Chinese computer businesspeople
Chinese computer scientists
20th-century Chinese inventors
Chinese technology company founders
Members of the Chinese Academy of Engineering
Members of the Chinese Academy of Sciences
Nanyang Model High School alumni
Peking University alumni
Vice Chairpersons of the National Committee of the Chinese People's Political Consultative Conference
People's Republic of China politicians from Jiangsu
Politicians from Wuxi
Scientists from Wuxi
UNESCO Science Prize laureates